Stenoxotus is a genus of beetles in the family Cerambycidae, containing the following species:

 Stenoxotus bertiae Vives, 2004
 Stenoxotus ochreoruber Fairmaire, 1896

References

Dorcasominae